Ahmad bin Yakob (born 1 February 1950) is a Malaysian politician and teacher who has served as the 19th Menteri Besar of Kelantan since May 2013 and Member of the Kelantan State Legislative Assembly (MLA) for Pasir Pekan since April 1995. He is a member, Deputy Spiritual Leader and State Commissioner of Kelantan of the Malaysian Islamic Party (PAS), a component party of the ruling Perikatan Nasional (PN) coalition.

Family 
Born on 1 February 1950 in Kampung Berangan, Tumpat, Kelantan to Islamic religious figures, namely Yakob Ishak, a senior activist of Pan-Malaysian Islamic Party (PAS) cum village religious teacher and Cik Zainab Cik Hussin, a housewife, who is a fellow PAS activist.

He tied the knot with a teacher, Siti Zubaidah Abdul Hamid (born 1961) in 1981 and the couple were blessed with 12 children.

Education 
Ahmad got his elementary education at Berangan Primary School and Bustanul Ariffin Islamic School, Tumpat, before he furthered his secondary education at Islamic Studies College in Kota Bahru. He then studied at Islamic Higher Education Centre of Kelantan, Kota Bahru; before he furthered his study outside Malaysia.

He got his Bachelor graduate from Al-Azhar University in Sharia in the 1970s. In 1979, he got Diploma of Education (Arabic Language) from Ain Shams University.

Career 
He started his educational service as a teacher in Dato' Bentara Dalam Secondary School, Segamat, Johor, in 1980. He then taught at Dabong Secondary School, Gua Musang (1986), Pasir Mas Girls' Secondary School (1986) and Rantau Panjang Secondary School (1987).

He resigned from being a teacher in 1995 to allow him to contest in Malaysian general election, 1995.

Political involvement 
His father is a PAS figure in Tumpat and detained under Internal Security Act (ISA) 1960 with another PAS figure, Nik Abdullah Arshad.

Ahmad registered as a PAS Member in 1986. Starting from 1986, he was appointed to some political post in PAS, Tumpat Chapter.

In 1995, he was offered to contest in 9th Malaysian General Election for Pasir Pekan assembly seat. He won against BN candidate, Saupi Daud, with the majority of 2,734 votes.

On 17 May 1997, Menteri Besar Nik Abdul Aziz Nik Mat appointed him as a State Executive Councillor (EXCO) in charge of Industry, Trade, Entrepreneurial Development and Human Resources, replacing Rozali Isohak for joining United Malays National Organisation (UMNO).

After 10th Malaysian General Election, he was appointed once again as a State EXCO in charge of Housing, Local Government, Science, Technology and Environment.

In 11th Malaysian General Election, he defeated BN candidate, Mohd. Noor Yaakob, at the same assembly seat with the majority of 2,271 votes.

Ahmad was chosen as the Deputy Menteri Besar of Kelantan on 23 March 2004, replacing Abdul Halim Abdul Rahman. He then was appointed replacing Nik Abdul Aziz Nik Mat as the Menteri Besar of Kelantan on 6 May 2013.

Honours
  :
  Knight Commander of the Order of the Life of the Crown of Kelantan (DJMK) – Dato' (2005)
  Knight Grand Commander of the Order of the Life of the Crown of Kelantan (SJMK) – Dato' (2010)

Election Results

References

External links 

 Government of Kelantan

1949 births
Chief Ministers of Kelantan
Al-Azhar University alumni
Living people
Malaysian people of Malay descent
Malaysian Muslims
People from Kelantan
Malaysian Islamic Party politicians
Members of the Kelantan State Legislative Assembly
Kelantan state executive councillors
Malaysian expatriates in Egypt